Sun Girl is the name of two fictional superheroines appearing in American comic books published by Marvel Comics.

Publication history
The first Sun Girl was created by artist Ken Bald and an unidentified writer. She first appeared in Sun Girl #1 (Aug. 1948), published by Marvel's 1940s precursor, Timely Comics. Sun Girl starred in a namesake three-issue series cover-dated August to December 1948.

The character subsequently co-starred in stories of the original Human Torch in The Human Torch #32-35 (Sept. 1948 - March 1949), Captain America Comics #69 (Nov. 1948), Sub-Mariner Comics #29 (Nov. 1948), and Marvel Mystery Comics #88-91 (Oct. 1948 - April 1949). She additionally starred in a solo story each in the first two of those Marvel Mystery issues. The Human Torch-Sun Girl story "The Ray of Madness" from The Human Torch #33 (Nov. 1948) was reprinted decades later in Marvel's Giant-Size Avengers #1 (Aug. 1974). Sun Girl appears in flashback in the final two issues of the four-issue miniseries Saga of the Original Human Torch (April–July 1990)

A new Sun Girl debuted in Superior Spider-Man Team-Up #1 and appeared as one of the main characters in the Marvel NOW! relaunch of the New Warriors.

Fictional character biography

Mary Mitchell
A personal secretary for Jim Hammond, the original Human Torch, during the post-war 1940s, Mary Mitchell falls in love with him and becomes his partner as well as his sidekick after Toro leaves to tend to his ailing foster mother. In The Human Torch #32 (Sept. 1948), Sun Girl helps the Torch clear the name of an innocent man accused of murder charges, by exposing the real culprit. Later, they convince a retired doctor to perform surgery on a little girl who accidentally swallowed a diamond hidden in a lollypop. Mary leaves to go on her own adventures after that. She carries a solar ray gun. She occasionally teams up with heroes besides the Torch, such as Captain America. After Toro returns she resumes her position as secretary and researcher.

During the "Last Days" part of the Secret Wars storyline, Sun Girl was seen living at Valhalla Villas (a retirement home for ex-heroes and ex-villains that is located in Miami). She is among the residents that were temporarily de-aged during the final incursion between Earth-616 and Earth-1610.

Selah Burke
{{Infobox comics character| 
|image=Sun Girl Superior Spider-man Team-Up 6.jpg
|imagesize = 250
|converted = y
|caption=Superior Spider-Man Team-Up' #6(November 2013).Art by Marco ChecchettoColors by Rachelle Rosenberg
|character_name=Sun Girl
|real_name=Selah Burke
|publisher=Marvel Comics
|debut=Superior Spider-Man Team-Up #1 (July 2013)
|creators=Marco Checchetto (artist)Christopher Yost (writer)
|alliances=New Warriors
|aliases=
|powers=Proficient engineerWields dual-wielding pistols and other light-based weaponsSuit with a harness that grants:FlightLight blast projection
}}

A new Sun Girl later appears as one of the heroes temporarily possessed by the Carrion virus after she came in contact with William Allen. Sun Girl is attacked by The Superior Spider-Man (Doctor Octopus' mind in Peter Parker's body). The Superior Spider-Man cures Sun Girl of the Carrion virus. Her identity is later revealed to be Selah Burke, the daughter of Lightmaster at the time when the Superior Spider-Man made use of his Superior Six (consisting of a brainwashed Chameleon, Electro, Mysterion, Sandman, and Vulture) to combat the Wrecking Crew. After the Superior Spider-Man fails and the now free Superior Six have captured him and taken hold of a machine that could destroy New York City, Selah manages to save Superior Spider-Man and destroy the machine. They part in bad terms, with Sun Girl thinking that Superior Spider-Man is a "jerk" due to his condescending attitude and insane brainwashing scheme.

Selah next appeared in issue #1 of the 2014 New Warriors'' relaunch, helping to save the Morlocks from an attack by the mysterious Evolutionaries. When offered the opportunity to walk away by these attackers (as they have no intention of going after normal humans), she opts to sacrifice so the mutants can run away. Haechi steps in and uses his energy absorbing powers to shield her. Speedball and Justice enter the scene which makes the three attackers reevaluate their tactical position and later flee as they were now outnumbered.

Powers and abilities
Mary Mitchell is a good acrobat and is an expert in both Judo and Jiu Jutsu. She also wields a Sunbeam Ray Gun which produces a bright blast of light as well as a lariat which she keeps in her emergency pouch.

Selah Burke is a brilliant engineer who creates a suit with a harness that grants her flight and the ability to project light blasts. The suit is later modified by the Superior Spider-Man. She also wields pistols capable of firing concussive blasts. She developed and constructed her gear and weapons based on her father's light manipulation technology.

References

External links
 Sun Girl (Mary Mitchell) at Marvel Wiki
 Sun Girl (Selah Burke) at Marvel Wiki

1948 comics debuts
Comics characters introduced in 1948
2013 comics debuts
Comics characters introduced in 2013
Marvel Comics sidekicks
Fictional acrobats
Fictional characters who can manipulate light
Fictional female engineers
Fictional secretaries
Golden Age superheroes
Timely Comics characters
Fictional African-American people
Comics about women
Marvel Comics female superheroes
Marvel Comics martial artists